Acrolophus parvus is a moth of the family Acrolophidae. It is found in the West Indies.

References

Moths described in 1892
parvus